The Tippecanoe Open was a golf tournament on the LPGA Tour from 1959 to 1961. It was played at the Tippecanoe Lake Country Club in Leesburg, Indiana. It was an unofficial event in 1959 and 1960.

Winners
Tippecanoe Open
1961 Kathy Cornelius

Leesburg Pro-Am
1960 Barbara Romack

Hoosier Celebrity
1959 Mickey Wright

References

Former LPGA Tour events
Golf in Indiana
History of women in Indiana